M. Chandrakasi (born 4 January 1969) is an Indian politician and Member of Parliament elected from Tamil Nadu. He is elected to the Lok Sabha from Chidambaram constituency as an Anna Dravida Munnetra Kazhagam candidate in 2014 election.

References 

All India Anna Dravida Munnetra Kazhagam politicians
Living people
India MPs 2014–2019
Lok Sabha members from Tamil Nadu
1969 births
Members of the Tamil Nadu Legislative Assembly